Renaissance literature refers to European literature which was influenced by the intellectual and cultural tendencies associated with the Renaissance. The literature of the Renaissance was written within the general movement of the Renaissance, which arose in 14th-century Italy and continued until the 16th century while being diffused into the rest of the western world. It is characterized by the adoption of a humanist philosophy and the recovery of the classical Antiquity. It benefited from the spread of printing in the latter part of the 15th century.

Overview
For the writers of the Renaissance, Greco-Roman inspiration was shown both in the themes of their writing and in the literary forms they used. The world was considered from an anthropocentric perspective. Platonic ideas were revived and put to the service of Christianity. The search for pleasures of the senses and a critical and rational spirit completed the ideological panorama of the period. New literary genres such as the essay (Montaigne) and new metrical forms such as the Spenserian stanza made their appearance. 

The impact of the Renaissance varied across the continent; countries that were predominantly Catholic or Protestant experienced the Renaissance differently. Areas where the Eastern Orthodox Church was culturally dominant, as well as those areas of Europe under Islamic rule, were more or less outside its influence. The period focused on self-actualization and one's ability to accept what is going on in one's life.

The earliest Renaissance literature appeared in Italy in the 14th century; Petrarch,  Machiavelli, and Ariosto are notable examples of Italian Renaissance writers. From Italy, the influence of the Renaissance spread at different times to other countries and continued to spread around Europe through the 17th century. The English Renaissance and the Renaissance in Scotland date from the late 15th century to the early 17th century. In northern Europe, the scholarly writings of Erasmus, the plays of William Shakespeare, the poems of Edmund Spenser, and the writings of Sir Philip Sidney may be considered Renaissance in character.

The development of the printing press (using movable type) by Johannes Gutenberg in the 1440s encouraged authors to write in their local vernacular instead of Greek or Latin classical languages, thus widening the reading audience and promoting the spread of Renaissance ideas.

See also
 Allegory in Renaissance literature
 British literature#The Renaissance
 Elizabethan literature
 English Renaissance theatre
 Renaissance in Croatia
 Dutch Renaissance and Golden Age literature
 French Renaissance literature
 German literature#German Renaissance and Reformation
 Italian Renaissance literature
 Polish Renaissance literature
 Portuguese Renaissance and Portuguese literature#First classical phase: The Renaissance
 Scottish Renaissance literature
 Spanish Renaissance literature
 Swedish literature#Renaissance literature

Literature by century
 15th century in literature
 16th century in literature

Poetry by century
 15th century in poetry
 16th century in poetry

External links

General Resources in the Renaissance & 17th Century